State Route 187 (SR 187) is a  north–south state highway in the central portion of the U.S. state of Ohio.

Route description
Starting out to the north-northeast, SR 187 is lined with a number of homes as it traverses just to the west of Choctaw Lake. Continuing on, the highway enters into an area dominated by farmland for the remainder of SR 187's trek, with houses appearing every so often. SR 187 intersects Arbuckle Road, curves to the north-northwest, then bends ever so slightly into a more northward direction as it arrives at its intersection with Tradersville-Brighton Road. North of there, SR 187 turns to the northwest, and passes by Lewis Road.

Now traveling through Goshen Township, SR 187 jogs briefly to the west, then resumes a northwesterly trend, arriving at its intersection with Davisson Road. The highway passes by a cluster of homes, meets Wren Road, then curves to the northeast.

History
SR 187 first appeared on maps in 1931, following the routing that it occupies today.  No major changes have taken place to SR 187 since its designation.

Major intersections

References

187
Transportation in Madison County, Ohio
Transportation in Champaign County, Ohio